Albert (Bert) Henry Baskerville (born as "Baskiville") (15 January 1883 – 20 May 1908) was a Wellington postal clerk, a rugby union forward, author of the book "Modern Rugby Football: New Zealand Methods; Points for the Beginner, the Player, the Spectator" and a pioneer of rugby league.

Rugby football
Prior to becoming the administrator of the 1907-08 tour Baskerville played rugby for the Wellington club in 1903 (making 2 appearances for their senior side) before switching to the Oriental club in 1904 where he played regularly in the backs for the senior side. He was said to be on the verge of provincial selection towards the end of the 1907 season but was not included in the Wellington representative side. He also played for the Post and Telegraph mid week side in 1904 which won the tournament beating Cycle and Bearers in the final. The following year in 1905 he represented the Wednesday Players representative side in a match against the Wairarapa Thursday representative side.  

Albert's father Henry had been killed in an accident on 30 January 1903 when doing some drainage works on Upper Queen Street in Auckland. He and some other workmen were working in a deep excavation when one side of it began to collapse, men called out but his father moved the wrong way and was buried to his neck. He was quickly removed but his injuries were too serious to survive. This left Albert as the main income earner for the family since then and they moved to Wellington shortly afterwards. His book, Modern Rugby Football: New Zealand Methods; Points for the Beginner, the Player, the Spectator, was published in 1907 and gave him somewhat of a national profile. After the success of this project he moved on to his next ambitious idea, a professional rugby tour of Great Britain. Baskerville competed in many athletic events from 1903 to 1907 as a short and middle distance runner where he would compete for prize money. In late 1905 he filed a patent for a "cuff protector and blotter".

The Tour

Baskerville wrote to the Northern Union and asked if they would host a touring party of New Zealand rugby players. The Northern Union were excited by this proposal and quickly agreed. After this Baskerville began to work on organising the tour full-time, leaving his job at the Postal Department and severing his connection with the Oriental Football Club. The Wellington Rugby Union moved quickly to attempt to stop him from attending their grounds and he received a life ban from the New Zealand Rugby Union. Despite this he managed to put together an impressive touring party that included eight All Blacks, including four from the 1905 tour of Great Britain. The team was dubbed the All Golds by the Sydney press, a derogatory play on the New Zealand rugby union team's nickname the All Blacks.

The tour was a great success both financially, each player earned roughly £300, and on the field, where the touring side won consecutive Test series against Great Britain and Australia. For most of the tour Baskerville was busy with the administration work and it was not until the final game of the British leg, against St Helens R.F.C., that Baskerville played, scoring a try. On arriving in Australia he then played in the first ever trans-Tasman test which was the debut match of the Australia national rugby league team, again scoring a try. That was to be the only time that Baskerville would represent New Zealand in a Test match. Baskerville contracted pneumonia on the ship taking the touring party from Sydney to Brisbane and, after several days in hospital, died aged 25 in Brisbane, Australia on 20 May 1908. His body was taken by manager Harry Palmer and a group of players from each province back to Wellington. The rest of the touring party stayed in Australia to complete their remaining fixtures. Like five other members of the touring party Baskerville is buried at Karori Cemetery.

Legacy
On their return from Australia the remaining members of the tour party held a memorial game, the first game of rugby league in New Zealand, and raised £300 for his widowed mother.

The Courtney Goodwill Trophy, international rugby league's first, was presented for the first time in 1936 and depicted Baskiville, along with other pioneering greats of the code, Jean Galia (France), James Lomas (England) and Dally Messenger (Australia).

He is commemorated by the naming of the Baskerville Shield, the trophy awarded when Great Britain and New Zealand meet in test series. In 2001 Baskerville was inducted as one of the NZRL Legends of League.

See also
2007 "All Golds" Tour – celebrating the centenary of Baskerville's 1907 Tour.
History of Rugby League

References

External links
 Rugby League Hall of Fame Baskiville page

1883 births
1908 deaths
Burials at Karori Cemetery
History of rugby league
History of rugby union
New Zealand national rugby league team players
New Zealand rugby league administrators
New Zealand rugby league players
New Zealand rugby union players
Rugby league in New Zealand
Rugby league players from Te Aroha
Rugby league wingers
Rugby union controversies
Rugby union players from Te Aroha
Wellington rugby union players